The Pleasure Pit (also known as Dirty Dolls in Kathmandu, The Road to Katmandu and Ways of Katmandu) is a 1969 French-Italian crime-drama film written and directed by André Cayatte. It is based on the novel Les Chemins de Katmandou written by René Barjavel.

Cast 

 Renaud Verley : Olivier
 Jane Birkin : Jane
 Elsa Martinelli : Martine
 Serge Gainsbourg : Ted
 Pascale Audret : Yvonne
 Arlene Dahl : Laureen
 Gilberte Géniat
 Mike Marshall
 Marc Michel
 David O'Brien
 Sacha Pitoëff

References

External links

1969 films
1969 crime drama films
French crime drama films
Italian crime drama films
Films directed by André Cayatte
Films scored by Serge Gainsbourg
Films with screenplays by René Barjavel
1960s French films
1960s Italian films